The 2001 AFL season was the 105th season of the Australian Football League (AFL), the highest level senior Australian rules football competition in Australia. The season featured sixteen clubs, ran from 30 March until 29 September, and comprised a 22-game home-and-away season followed by a finals series featuring the top eight clubs.

The premiership was won by the Brisbane Lions for the first time, after it defeated  by 26 points in the AFL Grand Final.

AFL Draft
See 2001 AFL Draft.

Ansett Australia Cup

Port Adelaide defeated the Brisbane Lions 17.9 (111) to 3.8 (26) in the grand final.

Premiership season

Round 1

|- style="background:#ccf;"
| Home team
| Score
| Away team
| Score
| Venue
| Attendance
| Date
|- style="background:#fff;"
| 
| 9.7 (61)
| 
| 23.8 (146)
| MCG
| 56,028
| Friday, 30 March
|- style="background:#fff;"
| 
| 13.7 (85)
| 
| 11.15 (81)
| MCG
| 52,190
| Saturday, 31 March
|- style="background:#fff;"
| 
| 18.10 (118)
| 
| 18.11 (119)
| Subiaco Oval
| 23,716
| Saturday, 31 March
|- style="background:#fff;"
| 
| 16.11 (107)
| 
| 16.16 (112)
| Colonial Stadium
| 30,047
| Saturday, 31 March
|- style="background:#fff;"
| 
| 14.15 (99)
| 
| 14.9 (93)
| Football Park
| 25,948
| Saturday, 31 March
|- style="background:#fff;"
| 
| 17.13 (115)
| 
| 7.7 (49)
| Shell Stadium
| 20,149
| Sunday, 1 April
|- style="background:#fff;"
| 
| 15.13 (103)
| 
| 20.14 (134)
| MCG
| 44,466
| Sunday, 1 April
|- style="background:#fff;"
| 
| 19.12 (126)
| 
| 10.14 (74)
| SCG
| 31,174
| Sunday, 1 April

Round 2

|- bgcolor="#CCCCFF"
| Home team
| Score
| Away team
| Score
| Venue
| Attendance
| Date
|- bgcolor="#FFFFFF"
| 
| 23.7 (145)
| 
| 16.11 (107)
| Colonial Stadium
| 34,918
| Friday, 6 April
|- bgcolor="#FFFFFF"
| 
| 11.15 (81)
| 
| 16.11 (107)
| Optus Oval
| 27,597
| Saturday, 7 April
|- bgcolor="#FFFFFF"
| 
| 9.15 (69)
| 
| 17.9 (111)
| MCG
| 36,427
| Saturday, 7 April
|- bgcolor="#FFFFFF"
| 
| 15.15 (105)
| 
| 13.10 (88)
| Colonial Stadium
| 26,067
| Saturday, 7 April
|- bgcolor="#FFFFFF"
| 
| 11.14 (80)
| 
| 12.11 (83)
| Football Park
| 35,653
| Saturday, 7 April
|- bgcolor="#FFFFFF"
| 
| 17.16 (118)
| 
| 8.10 (58)
| Gabba
| 22,970
| Sunday, 8 April
|- bgcolor="#FFFFFF"
| 
| 13.8 (86)
| 
| 17.13 (115)
| Colonial Stadium
| 33,867
| Sunday, 8 April
|- bgcolor="#FFFFFF"
| 
| 13.11 (89)
| 
| 15.14 (104)
| Subiaco Oval
| 32,673
| Sunday, 8 April

Round 3

|- bgcolor="#CCCCFF"
| Home team
| Score
| Away team
| Score
| Venue
| Attendance
| Date
|- bgcolor="#FFFFFF"
| 
| 14.9 (93)
| 
| 11.10 (76)
| MCG
| 63,088
| Thursday, 12 April
|- bgcolor="#FFFFFF"
| 
| 17.14 (116)
| 
| 14.10 (94)
| MCG
| 31,688
| Saturday, 14 April
|- bgcolor="#FFFFFF"
| 
| 12.9 (81)
| 
| 23.15 (153)
| Colonial Stadium
| 37,598
| Saturday, 14 April
|- bgcolor="#FFFFFF"
| 
| 11.5 (71)
| 
| 23.13 (151)
| SCG
| 22,395
| Saturday, 14 April
|- bgcolor="#FFFFFF"
| 
| 13.10 (88)
| 
| 23.15 (153)
| Football Park
| 40,296
| Sunday, 15 April
|- bgcolor="#FFFFFF"
| 
| 16.11 (107)
| 
| 19.11 (125)
| Colonial Stadium
| 19,496
| Sunday, 15 April
|- bgcolor="#FFFFFF"
| 
| 8.11 (59)
| 
| 11.16 (82)
| Subiaco Oval
| 20,703
| Sunday, 15 April
|- bgcolor="#FFFFFF"
| 
| 18.16 (124)
| 
| 15.14 (104)
| MCG
| 48,551
| Monday, 16 April

Round 4

|- bgcolor="#CCCCFF"
| Home team
| Score
| Away team
| Score
| Venue
| Attendance
| Date
|- bgcolor="#FFFFFF"
| 
| 10.11 (71)
| 
| 13.8 (86)
| MCG
| 78,638
| Friday, 20 April
|- bgcolor="#FFFFFF"
| 
| 6.19 (55)
| 
| 15.12 (102)
| SCG
| 40,131
| Friday, 20 April
|- bgcolor="#FFFFFF"
| 
| 8.5 (53)
| 
| 9.8 (62)
| Optus Oval
| 21,110
| Saturday, 21 April
|- bgcolor="#FFFFFF"
| 
| 21.14 (140)
| 
| 12.15 (87)
| Colonial Stadium
| 20,322
| Saturday, 21 April
|- bgcolor="#FFFFFF"
| 
| 13.10 (88)
| 
| 16.16 (112)
| Subiaco Oval
| 38,804
| Saturday, 21 April
|- bgcolor="#FFFFFF"
| 
| 17.12 (114)
| 
| 7.8 (50)
| Football Park
| 27,017
| Saturday, 21 April
|- bgcolor="#FFFFFF"
| 
| 4.9 (33)
| 
| 7.11 (53)
| Shell Stadium
| 14,298
| Sunday, 22 April
|- bgcolor="#FFFFFF"
| 
| 11.17 (83)
| 
| 5.14 (44)
| MCG
| 30,113
| Sunday, 22 April

Round 5

|- bgcolor="#CCCCFF"
| Home team
| Score
| Away team
| Score
| Venue
| Attendance
| Date
|- bgcolor="#FFFFFF"
| 
| 15.13 (103)
| 
| 14.11 (95)
| MCG
| 83,905
| Wednesday, 25 April
|- bgcolor="#FFFFFF"
| 
| 11.4 (70)
| 
| 17.7 (109)
| Subiaco Oval
| 38,424
| Friday, 27 April
|- bgcolor="#FFFFFF"
| 
| 17.23 (125)
| 
| 14.8 (92)
| Optus Oval
| 24,385
| Saturday, 28 April
|- bgcolor="#FFFFFF"
| 
| 19.12 (126)
| 
| 24.11 (155)
| Colonial Stadium
| 34,400
| Saturday, 28 April
|- bgcolor="#FFFFFF"
| 
| 12.18 (90)
| 
| 10.15 (75)
| Football Park
| 37,596
| Saturday, 28 April
|- bgcolor="#FFFFFF"
| 
| 25.21 (171)
| 
| 19.8 (122)
| Gabba
| 20,059
| Sunday, 29 April
|- bgcolor="#FFFFFF"
| 
| 15.12 (102)
| 
| 23.10 (148)
| Shell Stadium
| 18,736
| Sunday, 29 April
|- bgcolor="#FFFFFF"
| 
| 18.11 (119)
| 
| 15.14 (104)
| MCG
| 31,168
| Sunday, 29 April

Round 6

|- bgcolor="#CCCCFF"
| Home team
| Score
| Away team
| Score
| Venue
| Attendance
| Date
|- bgcolor="#FFFFFF"
| 
| 12.6 (78)
| 
| 19.15 (129)
| Colonial Stadium
| 39,773
| Friday, 4 May
|- bgcolor="#FFFFFF"
| 
| 18.12 (120)
| 
| 14.10 (94)
| Colonial Stadium
| 28,933
| Saturday, 5 May
|- bgcolor="#FFFFFF"
| 
| 9.20 (74)
| 
| 18.11 (119)
| Subiaco Oval
| 19,775
| Saturday, 5 May
|- bgcolor="#FFFFFF"
| 
| 20.9 (129)
| 
| 13.8 (86)
| Football Park
| 30,197
| Saturday, 5 May
|- bgcolor="#FFFFFF"
| 
| 17.14 (116)
| 
| 8.13 (61)
| Gabba
| 25,881
| Saturday, 5 May
|- bgcolor="#FFFFFF"
| 
| 15.13 (103)
| 
| 14.11 (95)
| MCG
| 73,572
| Sunday, 6 May
|- bgcolor="#FFFFFF"
| 
| 24.14 (158)
| 
| 10.10 (70)
| Colonial Stadium
| 33,829
| Sunday, 6 May
|- bgcolor="#FFFFFF"
| 
| 16.8 (104)
| 
| 12.19 (91)
| York Park
| 17,460
| Sunday, 6 May

Round 7

|- bgcolor="#CCCCFF"
| Home team
| Score
| Away team
| Score
| Venue
| Attendance
| Date
|- bgcolor="#FFFFFF"
| 
| 12.5 (77)
| 
| 15.17 (107)
| MCG
| 32,299
| Friday, 11 May
|- bgcolor="#FFFFFF"
| 
| 10.14 (74)
| 
| 16.24 (120)
| MCG
| 77,576
| Saturday, 12 May
|- bgcolor="#FFFFFF"
| 
| 15.9 (99)
| 
| 16.14 (110)
| Colonial Stadium
| 37,940
| Saturday, 12 May
|- bgcolor="#FFFFFF"
| 
| 14.19 (103)
| 
| 12.11 (83)
| Football Park
| 38,292
| Saturday, 12 May
|- bgcolor="#FFFFFF"
| 
| 14.13 (97)
| 
| 15.9 (99)
| Colonial Stadium
| 34,600
| Sunday, 13 May
|- bgcolor="#FFFFFF"
| 
| 9.14 (68)
| 
| 17.6 (108)
| MCG
| 29,150
| Sunday, 13 May
|- bgcolor="#FFFFFF"
| 
| 12.8 (80)
| 
| 15.22 (112)
| SCG
| 22,390
| Sunday, 13 May
|- bgcolor="#FFFFFF"
| 
| 7.8 (50)
| 
| 17.19 (121)
| Subiaco Oval
| 28,026
| Sunday, 13 May

Round 8

|- bgcolor="#CCCCFF"
| Home team
| Score
| Away team
| Score
| Venue
| Attendance
| Date
|- bgcolor="#FFFFFF"
| 
| 14.8 (92)
| 
| 17.18 (120)
| MCG
| 29,073
| Friday, 18 May
|- bgcolor="#FFFFFF"
| 
| 21.16 (142)
| 
| 9.14 (68)
| Optus Oval
| 21,997
| Saturday, 19 May
|- bgcolor="#FFFFFF"
| 
| 21.12 (138)
| 
| 8.10 (58)
| MCG
| 22,988
| Saturday, 19 May
|- bgcolor="#FFFFFF"
| 
| 19.24 (138)
| 
| 13.11 (89)
| Manuka Oval
| 10,958
| Saturday, 19 May
|- bgcolor="#FFFFFF"
| 
| 16.14 (110)
| 
| 18.11 (119)
| Football Park
| 34,232
| Saturday, 19 May
|- bgcolor="#FFFFFF"
| 
| 11.13 (79)
| 
| 12.13 (85)
| MCG
| 47,452
| Sunday, 20 May
|- bgcolor="#FFFFFF"
| 
| 18.14 (122)
| 
| 15.11 (101)
| SCG
| 22,874
| Sunday, 20 May
|- bgcolor="#FFFFFF"
| 
| 10.13 (73)
| 
| 14.11 (95)
| Subiaco Oval
| 20,231
| Sunday, 20 May

Round 9

|- bgcolor="#CCCCFF"
| Home team
| Score
| Away team
| Score
| Venue
| Attendance
| Date
|- bgcolor="#FFFFFF"
| 
| 10.9 (69)
| 
| 12.10 (82)
| MCG
| 43,624
| Friday, 25 May
|- bgcolor="#FFFFFF"
| 
| 14.14 (98)
| 
| 12.8 (80)
| MCG
| 49,937
| Saturday, 26 May
|- bgcolor="#FFFFFF"
| 
| 11.11 (77)
| 
| 18.17 (125)
| Subiaco Oval
| 30,063
| Saturday, 26 May
|- bgcolor="#FFFFFF"
| 
| 18.14 (122)
| 
| 19.13 (127)
| Gabba
| 24,122
| Saturday, 26 May
|- bgcolor="#FFFFFF"
| 
| 18.14 (122)
| 
| 8.9 (57)
| Colonial Stadium
| 50,701
| Saturday, 26 May
|- bgcolor="#FFFFFF"
| 
| 13.10 (88)
| 
| 9.14 (68)
| Football Park
| 22,423
| Sunday, 27 May
|- bgcolor="#FFFFFF"
| 
| 17.16 (118)
| 
| 11.10 (76)
| Shell Stadium
| 27,421
| Sunday, 27 May
|- bgcolor="#FFFFFF"
| 
| 12.12 (84)
| 
| 10.5 (65)
| SCG
| 20,611
| Sunday, 27 May

Round 10

|- bgcolor="#CCCCFF"
| Home team
| Score
| Away team
| Score
| Venue
| Attendance
| Date
|- bgcolor="#FFFFFF"
| 
| 11.13 (79)
| 
| 19.11 (125)
| Colonial Stadium
| 32,793
| Friday, 1 June
|- bgcolor="#FFFFFF"
| 
| 21.23 (149)
| 
| 3.12 (30)
| Optus Oval
| 19,757
| Saturday, 2 June
|- bgcolor="#FFFFFF"
| 
| 10.13 (73)
| 
| 17.14 (116)
| MCG
| 28,228
| Saturday, 2 June
|- bgcolor="#FFFFFF"
| 
| 17.11 (113)
| 
| 22.12 (144)
| Colonial Stadium
| 30,497
| Saturday, 2 June
|- bgcolor="#FFFFFF"
| 
| 15.12 (102)
| 
| 10.14 (74)
| Gabba
| 36,149
| Saturday, 2 June
|- bgcolor="#FFFFFF"
| 
| 9.12 (66)
| 
| 8.7 (55)
| Football Park
| 40,466
| Sunday, 3 June
|- bgcolor="#FFFFFF"
| 
| 7.13 (55)
| 
| 11.7 (73)
| Colonial Stadium
| 42,640
| Sunday, 3 June
|- bgcolor="#FFFFFF"
| 
| 6.10 (46)
| 
| 12.12 (84)
| Subiaco Oval
| 19,626
| Sunday, 3 June

Round 11

|- bgcolor="#CCCCFF"
| Home team
| Score
| Away team
| Score
| Venue
| Attendance
| Date
|- bgcolor="#FFFFFF"
| 
| 13.8 (86)
| 
| 19.14 (128)
| Colonial Stadium
| 40,075
| Friday, 8 June
|- bgcolor="#FFFFFF"
| 
| 14.9 (93)
| 
| 13.12 (90)
| Colonial Stadium
| 37,526
| Saturday, 9 June
|- bgcolor="#FFFFFF"
| 
| 9.8 (62)
| 
| 11.18 (84)
| Subiaco Oval
| 25,588
| Saturday, 9 June
|- bgcolor="#FFFFFF"
| 
| 14.13 (97)
| 
| 19.13 (127)
| Football Park
| 38,829
| Saturday, 9 June
|- bgcolor="#FFFFFF"
| 
| 23.16 (154)
| 
| 10.8 (68)
| Colonial Stadium
| 18,023
| Sunday, 10 June
|- bgcolor="#FFFFFF"
| 
| 13.10 (88)
| 
| 8.13 (61)
| MCG
| 71,767
| Sunday, 10 June
|- bgcolor="#FFFFFF"
| 
| 18.17 (125)
| 
| 10.18 (78)
| SCG
| 28,187
| Sunday, 10 June
|- bgcolor="#FFFFFF"
| 
| 8.9 (57)
| 
| 19.20 (134)
| MCG
| 62,761
| Monday, 11 June

Round 12

|- bgcolor="#CCCCFF"
| Home team
| Score
| Away team
| Score
| Venue
| Attendance
| Date
|- bgcolor="#FFFFFF"
| 
| 18.14 (122)
| 
| 11.7 (73)
| Colonial Stadium
| 38,816
| Friday, 15 June
|- bgcolor="#FFFFFF"
| 
| 13.9 (87)
| 
| 15.4 (94)
| Shell Stadium
| 22,771
| Saturday, 16 June
|- bgcolor="#FFFFFF"
| 
| 11.14 (80)
| 
| 12.18 (90)
| Subiaco Oval
| 19,857
| Saturday, 16 June
|- bgcolor="#FFFFFF"
| 
| 14.15 (99)
| 
| 23.10 (148)
| Gabba
| 23,740
| Sunday, 17 June
|- bgcolor="#FFFFFF"
| 
| 26.17 (173)
| 
| 14.8 (92)
| Colonial Stadium
| 36,589
| Friday, 22 June
|- bgcolor="#FFFFFF"
| 
| 15.11 (101)
| 
| 14.14 (98)
| MCG
| 41,295
| Saturday, 23 June
|- bgcolor="#FFFFFF"
| 
| 12.14 (86)
| 
| 8.12 (60)
| Colonial Stadium
| 37,196
| Saturday, 23 June
|- bgcolor="#FFFFFF"
| 
| 10.10 (70)
| 
| 15.14 (104)
| Football Park
| 35,805
| Sunday, 24 June

Round 13

|- bgcolor="#CCCCFF"
| Home team
| Score
| Away team
| Score
| Venue
| Attendance
| Date
|- bgcolor="#FFFFFF"
| 
| 20.20 (140)
| 
| 8.5 (53)
| Gabba
| 30,573
| Friday, 29 June
|- bgcolor="#FFFFFF"
| 
| 23.15 (153)
| 
| 13.14 (92)
| Optus Oval
| 30,067
| Saturday, 30 June
|- bgcolor="#FFFFFF"
| 
| 18.10 (118)
| 
| 10.12 (72)
| Colonial Stadium
| 29,528
| Saturday, 30 June
|- bgcolor="#FFFFFF"
| 
| 14.11 (95)
| 
| 10.13 (73)
| Manuka Oval
| 10,030
| Saturday, 30 June
|- bgcolor="#FFFFFF"
| 
| 14.13 (97)
| 
| 15.9 (99)
| Football Park
| 39,010
| Saturday, 30 June
|- bgcolor="#FFFFFF"
| 
| 13.9 (87)
| 
| 19.12 (126)
| Colonial Stadium
| 40,783
| Sunday, 1 July
|- bgcolor="#FFFFFF"
| 
| 9.11 (65)
| 
| 12.12 (84)
| SCG
| 26,760
| Sunday, 1 July
|- bgcolor="#FFFFFF"
| 
| 15.5 (95)
| 
| 13.10 (88)
| Subiaco Oval
| 29,783
| Sunday, 1 July

Round 14

|- bgcolor="#CCCCFF"
| Home team
| Score
| Away team
| Score
| Venue
| Attendance
| Date
|- bgcolor="#FFFFFF"
| 
| 11.10 (76)
| 
| 24.10 (154)
| Colonial Stadium
| 48,728
| Friday, 6 July
|- bgcolor="#FFFFFF"
| 
| 10.11 (71)
| 
| 20.9 (129)
| MCG
| 52,189
| Saturday, 7 July
|- bgcolor="#FFFFFF"
| 
| 8.16 (64)
| 
| 7.9 (51)
| Football Park
| 31,534
| Saturday, 7 July
|- bgcolor="#FFFFFF"
| 
| 17.17 (119)
| 
| 9.8 (62)
| Gabba
| 22,911
| Saturday, 7 July
|- bgcolor="#FFFFFF"
| 
| 16.15 (111)
| 
| 14.9 (93)
| Colonial Stadium
| 50,160
| Sunday, 8 July
|- bgcolor="#FFFFFF"
| 
| 13.15 (93)
| 
| 18.13 (121)
| MCG
| 27,464
| Sunday, 8 July
|- bgcolor="#FFFFFF"
| 
| 12.19 (91)
| 
| 12.9 (81)
| SCG
| 30,488
| Sunday, 8 July
|- bgcolor="#FFFFFF"
| 
| 11.5 (71)
| 
| 25.13 (163)
| Subiaco Oval
| 15,961
| Sunday, 8 July

Round 15

|- bgcolor="#CCCCFF"
| Home team
| Score
| Away team
| Score
| Venue
| Attendance
| Date
|- bgcolor="#FFFFFF"
| 
| 9.5 (59)
| 
| 23.18 (156)
| Colonial Stadium
| 26,560
| Friday, 13 July
|- bgcolor="#FFFFFF"
| 
| 16.15 (111)
| 
| 18.9 (117)
| Optus Oval
| 23,901
| Saturday, 14 July
|- bgcolor="#FFFFFF"
| 
| 11.11 (77)
| 
| 14.14 (98)
| MCG
| 34,394
| Saturday, 14 July
|- bgcolor="#FFFFFF"
| 
| 16.23 (119)
| 
| 11.19 (85)
| Colonial Stadium
| 15,111
| Saturday, 14 July
|- bgcolor="#FFFFFF"
| 
| 14.12 (96)
| 
| 7.10 (52)
| Football Park
| 26,773
| Saturday, 14 July
|- bgcolor="#FFFFFF"
| 
| 16.7 (103)
| 
| 19.15 (129)
| MCG
| 45,016
| Sunday, 15 July
|- bgcolor="#FFFFFF"
| 
| 19.13 (127)
| 
| 17.10 (112)
| Colonial Stadium
| 48,152
| Sunday, 15 July
|- bgcolor="#FFFFFF"
| 
| 17.8 (110)
| 
| 24.10 (154)
| Subiaco Oval
| 34,259
| Sunday, 15 July

Round 16

|- bgcolor="#CCCCFF"
| Home team
| Score
| Away team
| Score
| Venue
| Attendance
| Date
|- bgcolor="#FFFFFF"
| 
| 19.13 (127)
| 
| 12.14 (86)
| MCG
| 37,938
| Friday, 20 July
|- bgcolor="#FFFFFF"
| 
| 19.17 (131)
| 
| 8.8 (56)
| Optus Oval
| 15,622
| Saturday, 21 July
|- bgcolor="#FFFFFF"
| 
| 14.5 (89)
| 
| 21.18 (144)
| MCG
| 52,381
| Saturday, 21 July
|- bgcolor="#FFFFFF"
| 
| 12.6 (78)
| 
| 16.16 (112)
| Colonial Stadium
| 21,665
| Saturday, 21 July
|- bgcolor="#FFFFFF"
| 
| 13.16 (94)
| 
| 8.12 (60)
| Gabba
| 29,547
| Saturday, 21 July
|- bgcolor="#FFFFFF"
| 
| 7.14 (56)
| 
| 16.9 (105)
| Football Park
| 46,852
| Sunday, 22 July
|- bgcolor="#FFFFFF"
| 
| 27.9 (171)
| 
| 25.9 (159)
| MCG
| 51,878
| Sunday, 22 July
|- bgcolor="#FFFFFF"
| 
| 12.8 (80)
| 
| 22.18 (150)
| Subiaco Oval
| 31,456
| Sunday, 22 July

Round 17

|- bgcolor="#CCCCFF"
| Home team
| Score
| Away team
| Score
| Venue
| Attendance
| Date
|- bgcolor="#FFFFFF"
| 
| 15.10 (100)
| 
| 15.12 (102)
| Colonial Stadium
| 43,595
| Friday, 27 July
|- bgcolor="#FFFFFF"
| 
| 12.6 (78)
| 
| 10.6 (66)
| Shell Stadium
| 22,414
| Saturday, 28 July
|- bgcolor="#FFFFFF"
| 
| 12.12 (84)
| 
| 15.10 (100)
| MCG
| 17,566
| Saturday, 28 July
|- bgcolor="#FFFFFF"
| 
| 13.12 (90)
| 
| 19.5 (119)
| Subiaco Oval
| 20,498
| Saturday, 28 July
|- bgcolor="#FFFFFF"
| 
| 18.7 (115)
| 
| 21.10 (136)
| Colonial Stadium
| 26,776
| Saturday, 28 July
|- bgcolor="#FFFFFF"
| 
| 15.14 (104)
| 
| 14.13 (97)
| Football Park
| 37,930
| Sunday, 29 July
|- bgcolor="#FFFFFF"
| 
| 15.6 (96)
| 
| 13.15 (93)
| MCG
| 52,472
| Sunday, 29 July
|- bgcolor="#FFFFFF"
| 
| 11.17 (83)
| 
| 6.12 (48)
| SCG
| 20,669
| Sunday, 29 July

Round 18

|- bgcolor="#CCCCFF"
| Home team
| Score
| Away team
| Score
| Venue
| Attendance
| Date
|- bgcolor="#FFFFFF"
| 
| 10.11 (71)
| 
| 6.15 (51)
| MCG
| 69,930
| Friday, 3 August
|- bgcolor="#FFFFFF"
| 
| 15.10 (100)
| 
| 16.7 (103)
| MCG
| 31,074
| Saturday, 4 August
|- bgcolor="#FFFFFF"
| 
| 13.12 (90)
| 
| 16.10 (106)
| Colonial Stadium
| 16,595
| Saturday, 4 August
|- bgcolor="#FFFFFF"
| 
| 22.11 (143)
| 
| 3.18 (36)
| SCG
| 32,689
| Saturday, 4 August
|- bgcolor="#FFFFFF"
| 
| 16.11 (107)
| 
| 15.9 (99)
| Football Park
| 49,846
| Sunday, 5 August
|- bgcolor="#FFFFFF"
| 
| 19.22 (136)
| 
| 15.13 (103)
| Gabba
| 26,872
| Sunday, 5 August
|- bgcolor="#FFFFFF"
| 
| 14.11 (95)
| 
| 16.6 (102)
| MCG
| 75,873
| Sunday, 5 August
|- bgcolor="#FFFFFF"
| 
| 26.15 (171)
| 
| 12.7 (79)
| Subiaco Oval
| 31,358
| Sunday, 5 August

 claimed their first win of the season in their match against .

Round 19

|- bgcolor="#CCCCFF"
| Home team
| Score
| Away team
| Score
| Venue
| Attendance
| Date
|- bgcolor="#FFFFFF"
| 
| 21.5 (131)
| 
| 12.10 (82)
| Colonial Stadium
| 30,919
| Friday, 10 August
|- bgcolor="#FFFFFF"
| 
| 16.18 (114)
| 
| 19.11 (125)
| Colonial Stadium
| 14,018
| Saturday, 11 August
|- bgcolor="#FFFFFF"
| 
| 10.11 (71)
| 
| 24.12 (156)
| MCG
| 26,632
| Saturday, 11 August
|- bgcolor="#FFFFFF"
| 
| 16.10 (106)
| 
| 8.5 (53)
| Football Park
| 44,542
| Saturday, 11 August
|- bgcolor="#FFFFFF"
| 
| 19.14 (128)
| 
| 15.7 (97)
| Gabba
| 31,324
| Sunday, 12 August
|- bgcolor="#FFFFFF"
| 
| 17.17 (119)
| 
| 11.11 (77)
| MCG
| 38,793
| Sunday, 12 August
|- bgcolor="#FFFFFF"
| 
| 11.13 (79)
| 
| 11.11 (77)
| Colonial Stadium
| 45,057
| Sunday, 12 August
|- bgcolor="#FFFFFF"
| 
| 14.14 (98)
| 
| 9.10 (64)
| Subiaco Oval
| 41,285
| Sunday, 12 August

Round 20

|- bgcolor="#CCCCFF"
| Home team
| Score
| Away team
| Score
| Venue
| Attendance
| Date
|- bgcolor="#FFFFFF"
| 
| 15.10 (100)
| 
| 25.12 (162)
| Colonial Stadium
| 25,340
| Friday, 17 August
|- bgcolor="#FFFFFF"
| 
| 20.18 (138)
| 
| 10.13 (73)
| Colonial Stadium
| 25,856
| Saturday, 18 August
|- bgcolor="#FFFFFF"
| 
| 14.15 (99)
| 
| 10.9 (69)
| Football Park
| 25,536
| Saturday, 18 August
|- bgcolor="#FFFFFF"
| 
| 13.9 (87)
| 
| 15.17 (107)
| MCG
| 71,518
| Saturday, 18 August
|- bgcolor="#FFFFFF"
| 
| 12.7 (79)
| 
| 17.23 (125)
| MCG
| 26,642
| Sunday, 19 August
|- bgcolor="#FFFFFF"
| 
| 16.8 (104)
| 
| 22.16 (148)
| Colonial Stadium
| 34,521
| Sunday, 19 August
|- bgcolor="#FFFFFF"
| 
| 14.14 (98)
| 
| 19.17 (131)
| SCG
| 28,367
| Sunday, 19 August
|- bgcolor="#FFFFFF"
| 
| 12.15 (87)
| 
| 21.12 (138)
| Subiaco Oval
| 15,136
| Sunday, 19 August

Round 21

|- bgcolor="#CCCCFF"
| Home team
| Score
| Away team
| Score
| Venue
| Attendance
| Date
|- bgcolor="#FFFFFF"
| 
| 13.14 (92)
| 
| 13.10 (88)
| MCG
| 37,776
| Friday, 24 August
|- bgcolor="#FFFFFF"
| 
| 20.10 (130)
| 
| 9.8 (62)
| MCG
| 70,051
| Saturday, 25 August
|- bgcolor="#FFFFFF"
| 
| 6.11 (47)
| 
| 21.10 (136)
| Subiaco Oval
| 36,445
| Saturday, 25 August
|- bgcolor="#FFFFFF"
| 
| 10.13 (73)
| 
| 22.18 (150)
| Colonial Stadium
| 19,649
| Saturday, 25 August
|- bgcolor="#FFFFFF"
| 
| 13.13 (91)
| 
| 8.5 (53)
| Football Park
| 42,827
| Sunday, 26 August
|- bgcolor="#FFFFFF"
| 
| 9.13 (67)
| 
| 16.14 (110)
| Shell Stadium
| 24,325
| Sunday, 26 August
|- bgcolor="#FFFFFF"
| 
| 16.18 (114)
| 
| 12.7 (79)
| Colonial Stadium
| 12,566
| Sunday, 26 August
|- bgcolor="#FFFFFF"
| 
| 21.16 (142)
| 
| 8.7 (55)
| SCG
| 26,334
| Sunday, 26 August

Round 22

|- bgcolor="#CCCCFF"
| Home team
| Score
| Away team
| Score
| Venue
| Attendance
| Date
|- bgcolor="#FFFFFF"
| 
| 12.11 (83)
| 
| 17.5 (107)
| MCG
| 77,028
| Friday, 31 August
|- bgcolor="#FFFFFF"
| | 13.19 (97)| 
| 3.9 (27)
| Optus Oval
| 26,314
| Saturday, 1 September
|- bgcolor="#FFFFFF"
| | 17.18 (120)| 
| 11.17 (83)
| Subiaco Oval
| 19,535
| Saturday, 1 September
|- bgcolor="#FFFFFF"
| 
| 13.9 (87)
| | 13.11 (89)| MCG
| 24,113
| Saturday, 1 September
|- bgcolor="#FFFFFF"
| | 13.15 (93)| 
| 9.8 (62)
| Gabba
| 33,606
| Saturday, 1 September
|- bgcolor="#FFFFFF"
| | 24.19 (163)| 
| 7.9 (51)
| Football Park
| 22,976
| Sunday, 2 September
|- bgcolor="#FFFFFF"
| 
| 11.17 (83)
| | 19.12 (126)| Manuka Oval
| 13,117
| Sunday, 2 September
|- bgcolor="#FFFFFF"
| 
| 19.9 (123)
| | 21.7 (133)'''
| Colonial Stadium
| 21,146
| Sunday, 2 September

Ladder
All teams played 22 games during the home and away season, for a total of 176. An additional nine games were played during the finals series.

Ladder progression

Finals series

Week one

Week two

Week three

Week four

Match attendance

Awards
 The Brownlow Medal was awarded to Jason Akermanis of the Brisbane Lions.
 The AFL Players Association MVP Award went to Andrew McLeod of Adelaide.
 This was the last year for the award under this name; starting with the 2002 season, it would be renamed the "Leigh Matthews Trophy".
 The Coleman Medal was awarded to Matthew Lloyd of Essendon.
 The Norm Smith Medal was awarded to Shaun Hart of the Brisbane Lions.
 The AFL Rising Star award was awarded to Justin Koschitzke of St Kilda.

Notable events
 In their Round 16 match, Essendon trailed by 69 points 12 minutes into the second quarter against the Kangaroos, but recovered to record a high-scoring 12-point win. This presently stands as the largest ever comeback in a VFL/AFL game.
 and  began its annual tradition of playing each other at the M.C.G. in a Melbourne home game on Queen's Birthday Holiday, as the only AFL match of the day. The teams had met on the King's or Queen's Birthday Holiday sporadically in the past (1950, 1958, 1961, 1964, 1975, 1977, 1983, 1993, 1996 and 1999) as one of several games played on the day, with the 1958 game's attendance of 99,256 still enduring as the highest crowd for a non-final, but this was the first season that the fixture became annual, and the second time (after 1996) that the game was the only one played on the day.
 The longest recorded quarter occurred during the Round 5 match between Hawthorn and the Western Bulldogs. The second quarter went for 40 minutes and 39 seconds.
  lost their first 17 matches of the season in succession; having lost in the final round of the 2000 season, this took the Dockers' losing streak to 18, the longest drought since Sydney's 26 consecutive losses in 1992 and 1993.
 During the season, it came to the attention of the AFL that in 2000 and 2001, the  had been using a controversial but then-legal practice of rehydrating its players by use of intravenous saline drip during half-time and between matches. The half-time drips were administered through stents which were inserted into the players' elbows prior to the game and covered with tape during the game. The AFL was concerned about negative perceptions of the practice, and the Lions agreed in early September to immediately cease intravenous rehydration. The league banned the practice in the 2002 pre-season, and the World Anti Doping Agency later banned the practice in 2007.

References

 2001 Season – AFL Tables

 
AFL season
Australian Football League seasons